There are many nicknames for the city of Vancouver, the largest city in British Columbia and third-largest metropolitan area in Canada. Some reflect the city's history, climate, geography, economy, and demographics. Others have their origins in cultural aspects of the city and its inhabitants.

History
The first non-aboriginal settlement in the area was known as Gastown. This name continues today as a nickname for Vancouver, although more specifically for the original core of the city, which is part of the Downtown Eastside.

Geography and climate
Rain City (or Raincouver or the Wet Coast) – Vancouver receives on average  of rainfall a year (YVR).  Especially during the winter months, the city has a reputation for wet weather.
Terminal City – refers to Vancouver (or specifically Gastown) being the western terminus of the Canadian Pacific Railway.
Saltwater City – name for Vancouver used by early Chinese immigrants to the city.

Industry
Hollywood North – the city is home to the third-largest film and television production industry in North America, after LA and New York.
The Big Smoke – Vancouver's heavy fogs in combination with the many sawmill burners and other industrial pollution produced thick smog.  Common as slang and in casual usage.  It is also used outside of BC for Toronto, London, Sydney and other places.  Very common in use within BC, especially in the BC Interior, for both Vancouver and the Lower Mainland in general.

Culture
Vansterdam – like Amsterdam, Vancouver has a reputation for relaxed attitudes towards recreational drug use, specifically marijuana.
Lotusland – coined by Vancouver Sun writer Allan Fotheringham, Lotusland refers to Homer's Odyssey, in which the hero, Odysseus, visits a land whose inhabitants are befuddled by a narcotic lotus (the "Land of the Lotus-Eaters").  It sometimes is used to describe all of British Columbia.
City of Glass – taken from the title of a Douglas Coupland book, this name reflects the dominant steel-and-glass architectural aesthetic of the city's downtown.
No Fun City (or Nofuncouver) – long-time nickname which can refer to a variety of things depending on use and context. It can refer to some of the city's cultural policies that result in a less lively local music scene, to a perceived "lame" nightlife.
Blandcouver – similar to 'No Fun City,' this nickname is often used self-deprecatingly by locals who think Vancouver's cosmopolitanism is over-hyped.

Demographics
Hongcouver – name with xenophobic connotations, it came into use in the 1980s and 1990s. Although Vancouver has had a large Chinese community from its earliest days, the Chinese population surged as large numbers of Hong Kong citizens immigrated prior to the British handover of that city in 1997.

Diminutives
Downtown – common inside of BC to refer to the whole of actual Vancouver
The V – contemporary moniker originating in the Canadian hip hop community 
Van – common outside the city proper and as an abbreviation 
V-town – virtually unused in BC, but in moderate use within Alberta
East Van – not common outside of BC, but most residents of East Vancouver use this
Vancity – originated in the Canadian hip hop community, has since come into popular usage in and outside of BC (Vancity is also the name of a local credit union)
The 'Couve – very rare in Vancouver, BC, but instead frequently used to refer to Vancouver, Washington. It was used by United States reporters during the 2010 Winter Olympics especially by Stephanie Abrams of The Weather Channel.

See also
 List of city nicknames in Canada
 Lists of nicknames – nickname list articles on Wikipedia
 Left coast

References

Vancouver
Vancouver
Culture of Vancouver